There are several islands called Linga, or similar names, in Scotland. "Linga", in the Northern Isles, and sometimes "Lingay" and "Lingeigh" in the Hebrides, is a common name for an island, and occurs most frequently in Shetland. It is derived from the old Norse lyngey meaning 'heather island'. The Scottish Gaelic equivalent is Eilean Fraoch or Fraoch Eilean.

Shetland
 Linga, Bluemull Sound (near Gutcher and Yell)
 Linga, Busta Voe 
 Linga, Scalloway Islands 
 Hogg of Linga 
 Linga, Vaila Sound
 Linga (near Vementry)
 Linga, Yell Sound
Linga Skerries
 Off Whalsay
 West Linga
 Calf of Linga, West Linga 
 Little Linga 
Calf of Little Linga
 East Linga
 Calf of Linga, East Linga 
 Linga Skerries in South Nesting Bay off Mainland, Shetland
 Urie Lingey off Fetlar

Orkney
 Off Stronsay
 Linga Holm (off St Catherine's Bay)
 Little Linga, Stronsay (off Links Ness)
 Off Auskerry
 Linga Skerries

Hebrides
 Lingay, Fiaray north of Barra and west of Eriskay
 Lingay, Killegray south east of Killegray in the Sound of Harris
 Lingeigh in the Bishop's Isles, south of Barra
 Lingay, Wiay off Benbecula
 Langay or Langaigh, an islet north of Lingay, Killegray and east of Killegray in the Sound of Harris
 Lingay Fhada north of Fuiay and Barra, and south west of Hellisay
 Garbh Lingay also north of Fuiay and Barra, and south west of Hellisay
 Lingeam (from Norse "Lyng Holm")
 Lingeigh, North Uist south east of Boreray

Similar names
There are also a number of Scottish islands with similar names, including:
 
 Langa, Shetland, off Hildasay, Shetland
 Longa, near Gairloch in Wester Ross
 Longa Skerry, off West Linga, Shetland
 Longay off Skye
 Luing in the Slate Islands
 Luinn, (the Gaelic for Luing)
 Lunga, Treshnish Isles off Mull
 Lunga, Firth of Lorn in the Slate Islands, Argyll
 Lunna Holm off Yell, Shetland

See also
Linga (disambiguation)
List of islands in Scotland

References
Haswell-Smith, Hamish (2004) The Scottish Islands. Edinburgh. Canongate. 

Scottish Island set index articles